Dixie Violet Egerickx (born 31 October 2005) is an English actress. She has appeared in films including The Little Stranger, Summerland, and The Secret Garden.

Career and personal life
Dixie Violet Egerickx was discovered at school at the age of 8 by casting director Kate Bone. Egerickx has appeared three times on the London stage, as Iphigenia in Robert Icke's adaptation of Oresteia, Rosalind in Alexi Kay Campbell's Sunset at the Villa Thalia at the National Theatre and as Jenny Caroline 'Qui Qui' Marx in Richard Bean and Clive Coleman's Young Marx at The Bridge Theatre, directed by Sir Nicholas Hytner. She appeared in the 2017 National Geographic series Genius and the 2018 television series Patrick Melrose making her feature film debut in the 2018 film The Little Stranger. Egerickx was named in Screen Internationals Screen Stars of Tomorrow list in 2019 at the age of 13. She starred as Edie in the 2020 drama film Summerland, and portrayed Mary Lennox in the 2020 film The Secret Garden. In 2019 she filmed HBO's Unaired Game of Thrones Prequel Pilot and most recently has completed filming the role of Jo Ransome in the Apple TV miniseries of The Essex Serpent, directed by Clio Barnard.==

Filmography

Films

Television

Stage

References

External links

Living people
2005 births
Actresses from London
English child actresses
English people of Belgian descent